Enrico Papi (born 3 June 1965) is an Italian television presenter.

Tv

Rai 

 Fantastico bis (Rai 1, 1988-1990)
 Unomattina (Rai 1, 1990-1994)
 La Banda dello Zecchino (Rai 1, 1992)
 Unomattina Estate (Rai 1, 1992-1993)
 Fatti e misfatti (Rai 1, 1993)
 Chiacchiere (Rai 1, 1995)
 Chiacchiere di Enrico Papi (Rai 1, 1995-1996)
 51º Festival della Canzone Italiana di Sanremo (Rai 1, 2001)
 Dopo il Festival tutti da me (Rai 1, 2001)

Mediaset 

 Papi quotidiani (Canale 5, 1996)
 Tutti in piazza (Canale 5, 1996)
 Verissimo (Canale 5, 1996-1997)
 Edizione straordinaria (Italia 1, 1997)
 Sarabanda (Italia 1, 1997-2004, 2017)
 Buona Domenica (Canale 5, 1997-1998)
 Regalo di Natale (Italia 1, 1997)
 Sapore d'estate (Canale 5, 1998)
 Predizioni (Italia 1, 1999)
 Beato tra le donne (Canale 5, 1999)
 Matricole (Italia 1, 2001)
 Il traditore (Italia 1, 2001)
 Anello debole (The Weakest Link) (Italia 1, 2001)
 Miss Universo Italia 2003 (Canale 5, 2002)
 Matricole & Meteore (Italia 1, 2002)
 Papirazzo (Italia 1, 2003-2004)
 ModaMare a Porto Cervo (Canale 5, 2003)
 3, 2, 1 Baila (Italia 1, 2004)
 L'imbroglione (Canale 5, 2004)
 Il gioco dei 9 (Italia 1, 2004)
 Super Sarabanda (Italia 1, 2005)
 La pupa e il secchione (Italia 1, 2006)
 Distraction (Italia 1, 2007)
 Prendere o lasciare (Italia 1, 2007)
 La ruota della fortuna (Italia 1, 2007-2009)
 Batti le bionde (Italia 1, 2008)
 Jackpot - Fate il vostro gioco (Canale 5, 2008)
 Il colore dei soldi (Italia 1, 2009)
 La ruota della fortuna - Celebrity Edition (Italia 1, 2009-2010)
 CentoxCento (Italia 1, 2010)
 La pupa e il secchione - Il ritorno (Italia 1, 2010)
 Viva Las Vegas - Fate il vostro gioco (Italia 1, 2010)
 Trasformat (Italia 1, 2010-2011)
 Top One (Italia 1, 2013-2014)
 Scherzi a parte (Canale 5, 2021-2022)
 Big Show - Enrico Papi (Canale 5, 2022)

Sky 
 Guess My Age - Indovina l'età (TV8, 2017-2021)
 La notte dei record (TV8, 2018)
 Italia's Got Talent (TV8 and Sky Uno, 2020-2021)
 Name That Tune - Indovina la canzone (TV8, 2020-2021)

Filmography

Dubbing 
 Mulan, Mushu (1998)

Actor 
 The Bold and the Beautiful, serie TV (episodio No. 3214, 2000)
 Ravanello pallido (2001)
 Ambo (2015)

Videoclip musicali 
 Tutto molto interessante (2016)
 Mooseca (2017)

References 

1965 births
Living people
Mass media people from Rome
Italian television presenters
Italian game show hosts